Trinity Baptist Church may refer to:

Trinity Baptist Church (Concord, New Hampshire), site of a 2011 sex scandal
Trinity Baptist Church in Marion, Ohio, located in the former Marion Public Library
Trinity Baptist Ministries (Port Saint Lucie, Florida)

See also
Trinity Church (disambiguation)